The 2003 J. League Division 2 season was the 32nd season of the second-tier club football in Japan and the 5th season since the establishment of J2 League.

In this season, twelve clubs competed in the quadruple round-robin format. The top two received promotion to the J. League Division 1. There were no relegation to the third-tier Japan Football League.

General

Promotion and relegation 
To be completed

Changes in competition formats 
To be completed

Changes in clubs 
To be completed

Participating clubs 

Following twelve clubs played in J. League Division 2 during 2003 season. Of these clubs, Consadole Sapporo and Sanfrecce Hiroshima were relegated from Division 1 last year.

 Consadole Sapporo 
 Albirex Niigata
 Montedio Yamagata
 Mito HollyHocks
 Omiya Ardija
 Kawasaki Frontale
 Yokohama F.C.
 Shonan Bellmare
 Ventforet Kofu
 Sanfrecce Hiroshima 
 Avispa Fukuoka
 Sagan Tosu

League format 
Twelve clubs will play in quadruple round-robin format, a total of 44 games each. A club receives 3 points for a win, 1 point for a tie, and 0 points for a loss. The clubs are ranked by points, and tie breakers are, in the following order:
 Goal differential
 Goals scored
 Head-to-head results
A draw would be conducted, if necessary. However, if two clubs are tied at the first place, both clubs will be declared as the champions. The top two clubs are promoted to J1.

Final league table

Final results

Top scorers

Attendance figures

References 

J2 League seasons
2
Japan
Japan